Buzzle Lake is a lake in Beltrami County, Minnesota, in the United States.  The lake is northwest of the town of Pinewood, Minnesota. Buzzle Lake was named for a pioneer who settled on the lake.

The lake is 189 acres in size, and is approximately 83 feet deep at its deepest point. Fish present in the lake include Bluegill and Northern Pike.

See also
List of lakes in Minnesota

References

Lakes of Minnesota
Lakes of Beltrami County, Minnesota